The Five Branches University is a private university in California.

It has two campuses, one in Santa Cruz and one in San Jose.

History
Five Branches University was founded in Santa Cruz on February 4, 1984.

In 2005, Five Branches University opened their second campus in San Jose in Tisch Tower at the end of the famous Santana Row. In the spring of 2016, the Santa Jose Campus moved to its current location on Lundy Ave.

Accreditation
Five Branches University is accredited by the Accreditation Commission for Acupuncture and Oriental Medicine (ACAOM). ACAOM is the national accrediting agency recognized by the U.S. Department of Education for the accreditation and pre-accreditation ("Candidacy") throughout the United States of first-professional master's degree and professional master's-level certificate and diploma programs in acupuncture and Oriental medicine, and professional post-graduate doctoral programs in acupuncture and in Oriental medicine (DAOM).

Degrees 
The school offers accredited:

 Dual Degree Doctor/Master of Traditional Chinese Medicine (DTCM/MTCM)
 Master of Acupuncture(MAc)
 Doctor of Acupuncture & Oriental Medicine (DAOM) degree

The MTCM, MAC, and DAOM degrees are accredited by the Accreditation Commission for Acupuncture and Oriental Medicine (ACAOM). They provide a Bridge Program with an MTCM or equivalent to earn a First Professional Doctoral degree in Traditional Chinese Medicine/Acupuncture. The program is all online.

References

External links
 Official website

Educational institutions established in 1984
Universities and colleges in Santa Cruz County, California
Universities and colleges in San Jose
1984 establishments in California
Private universities and colleges in California